Sir John Stewart, 1st Baronet (c.1758 – 22 June 1825) was an Irish lawyer and politician. He was a son of Church of Ireland clergyman, the Reverend Hugh Stewart, Rector of Termonmaguirk, County Tyrone and Sarah Hamilton, daughter of the Venerable Andrew Hamilton, who was Archdeacon of Raphoe for more than sixty years. He was educated in Drogheda and at Trinity College Dublin, studied law at Lincoln's Inn, and was called to the Irish Bar in 1781.

In 1794, he was elected to the Irish House of Commons for Augher. At the 1797 elections, he was elected for four constituencies: Askeaton, Bangor, Portarlington and Strabane. He chose to sit for Bangor, and held that seat until the dissolution of the Parliament of Ireland when the Act of Union came into effect in 1801. He was Solicitor-General for Ireland from 1798 to 1799 and Attorney-General for Ireland from 1799 to 1803. He was High Sheriff of County Tyrone in 1809.

After the Act of Union he was elected to the Parliament of the United Kingdom as Tory Member of Parliament (MP) for Tyrone from 1802 to 1806 and 1812 until his death in 1825.

Stewart married in 1789, Mary, daughter of Mervyn Archdale of Castle Archdale, near Enniskillen, with whom he had two sons and a daughter.

Driving a two-horse carriage while suffering from long-term sickness, he was badly injured when his horses bolted and died four days later in June 1825. He was succeeded in the baronetcy by his elder son, Hugh.

References

External links 
 

1758 births
1825 deaths
Members of the Parliament of the United Kingdom for County Tyrone constituencies (1801–1922)
Tory MPs (pre-1834)
Irish Conservative Party MPs
UK MPs 1806–1807
UK MPs 1807–1812
UK MPs 1812–1818
UK MPs 1818–1820
UK MPs 1820–1826
Baronets in the Baronetage of the United Kingdom
People from County Tyrone
Attorneys-General for Ireland
Irish MPs 1790–1797
Irish MPs 1798–1800
Members of the Privy Council of Ireland
High Sheriffs of Tyrone
Members of the Parliament of Ireland (pre-1801) for Portarlington
Members of the Parliament of Ireland (pre-1801) for County Tyrone constituencies
Members of the Parliament of Ireland (pre-1801) for County Limerick constituencies
Members of the Parliament of Ireland (pre-1801) for County Down constituencies